Badr Hari (born 8 December 1984) is a Dutch-born Moroccan kickboxer. He is a former K-1 Heavyweight World Champion (2007–2008), It's Showtime Heavyweight World Champion (2009–2010) and K-1 World Grand Prix 2008 and 2009 finalist. Born and raised in the Netherlands, Hari fights under the Moroccan flag.

Hari has been officially praised by the King of Morocco, Mohammed VI, since 2009 for his outstanding accomplishments in the sport.

Early life

Badr Hari, born and raised in Amsterdam in the Netherlands, is of Moroccan Berber descent. His parents are Moroccans from the Houara tribe of the Sous region who moved to the Netherlands. Hari began practicing kickboxing at the age of seven, under the guidance of former World Champion Mousid Akamrane. As a teenager he trained at the Sitan Gym of Mohammed Aït Hassou. When the Sitan Gym moved to Rotterdam, he joined the famous Chakuriki Gym ran by Thom Harinck. Hari was fighting under the Dutch flag until a loss against Stefan Leko in 2005. It was the first time his parents attended one of his fights so he asked to address the Dutch audience. Hari could not be understood as the audience proceeded to boo him, after which Hari was quoted saying "I thought to myself, I have never witnessed such ungratefulness". From then on Hari has represented Morocco and stopped working with Thom Harinck. Mike Passenier became his new coach.

Kickboxing career

Early career
At the age of seven, Hari was sent by his father to the kickboxing gym to learn how to defend himself from bullies in the neighborhood. People quickly realized he was a natural talent and from the age of 11 he was fighting regularly as a junior. In his teenage years he worked with the legendary trainer Thom Harinck at Chakuriki Gym and it was at this time he started to become well known on the Amsterdam scene.

At the age of 18 he had 50 amateur fights on his record and was ready to fight at a professional level. A year later he was fighting in front of an audience of thousands at the Johan Cruijf Arena, the biggest soccer stadium in the Netherlands. His opponent was Alexey Ignashov. Hari took the fight on short notice and lost, but won respect from the crowd and from Ignashov for his display of heart.

In January 2005, Hari left the Chakuriki Gym and joined Simon Rutz's It's Showtime team. After a few months' training at the Mejiro Gym he returned to Harinck's, but left again a couple of weeks later. Since then he has been coached by Mike Passenier, who has also trained Joerie Mes, Bjorn Bregy and Melvin Manhoef.

Road to K-1
Hari's road to fame began with a pair of matches against Stefan Leko in 2005. The first took place at an It's Showtime 2005 event in June 2005. Hari had started trash talk between him and his opponent before the fight but Hari's unusually long ring entrance ended up being longer than the fight itself, where Hari was knocked out by Leko's trademark spinning back kick.

Hari got his opportunity for revenge in November 2005 when he entered the K-1 World Grand Prix 2005 tournament as a reserve fighter against Leko, making his K-1 World GP debut at the age of 20. Hari knocked out Leko by a spinning back high kick to the jaw at 1:30 in the second round. After the bad blood between both fighters, Hari helped his opponent up and escorted the dazed German to the corner.

K-1 New Zealand 2006
In 2006 Badr Hari was scheduled to participate in the K-1 World Grand Prix 2006 in Amsterdam on 13 May 2006, but fought in the K-1 World Grand Prix 2006 in Auckland, in New Zealand, instead as a last minute replacement. His opponent in the first round was Australian Peter "The Chief" Graham. Hari once again showed his bad boy reputation by abusing Graham and starting a street fight at the press conference. In the actual fight Hari was knocked out by Graham's trademark "Rolling Thunder". The heel hit Hari hard on the head and knocked him out cold. Graham's kick broke Hari's jaw in multiple places and sidelined Hari for twelve months.

Return to K-1
Hari returned to the ring at the K-1 World Grand Prix 2006 Final Elimination in Osaka, Japan against Ruslan Karaev. Karaev hurt Badr with a straight right that left Hari slouching over in the corner, then Karaev delivered a kick to Hari's face: Hari was counted out by the referee but immediately he and his corner protested, claiming the kick was a foul. When the referee did not respond, Hari and his corner men caused a commotion and refused to leave the ring until they were escorted out by K-1 officials. Hari left in anger and trashed his changing room. Six months later, Hari would get a rematch.

Despite being knocked out, Hari was once again picked as a reserve fighter in the K-1 Grand Prix 2006 Finals against Paul Slowinski. He won the fight by unanimous decision. Hari then fought the Danish Nicholas Pettas at the K-1 Premium 2006 Dynamite!! event and broke Pettas's left shoulder in the second round with a right high kick.

Hari got his revenge against Karaev at the K-1 World GP 2007 in Yokohama. Karaev and Hari's matchup was one of two bouts to qualify for the first K-1 heavyweight title match, scheduled on 28 April 2007 in Hawaii. Hari was knocked down in the second round and was just able to make it back to his feet when Karaev intended to finish the fight with a swinging punch which Hari ducked, and landed a right cross to score a KO.

K-1 Heavyweight champion
On 28 April, at K-1 World GP 2007 in Hawaii, Badr Hari and Yusuke Fujimoto fought for the newly introduced Heavyweight belt. Hari won the fight in 56 seconds with a kick to the chin. With the knockout Hari became the first ever K-1 Heavyweight champion.

Hari got his chance for revenge against Peter Graham, whose turning kick had broken his jaw in 2006, in Hong Kong at the K-1 World Grand Prix 2007 in Hong Kong. He dropped Graham with a body punch and won by unanimous decision. After the bout, Hari and Graham seemed to bury the hatchet, hugging each other, although the two started taunting each other again at the post-fight press conference.

In September 2007 at the K-1 World GP 2007 Final Elimination, Badr Hari beat the K-1 World GP 2007 in Las Vegas tournament champion, Doug Viney, by a second-round KO and qualified for his first K-1 World GP Final, held on 8 December in Yokohama, Japan. His winning streak came to an end with a decision loss to Remy Bonjasky, in the quarter finals.

2008

K-1 World GP 2008
All of Hari's wins in 2008 were by knockouts, by beating Ray Sefo in Yokohama, Glaube Feitosa (whom he defended his heavyweight title) in Fukuoka and Domagoj Ostojic in Hawaii. On his next fight in Seoul he qualified for the K-1 World Grand Prix 2008 Final by TKO win over the Korean Hong Man Choi.

In the quarterfinals on 6 December, Hari defeated three time K-1 World champion Peter Aerts by TKO in the second round. In the semi final he knocked out Errol Zimmerman and advanced to his first K-1 Final against Remy Bonjasky. After suffering a knockdown in the first, Hari was disqualified in the second round for unsportsmanlike conduct by having stomped and punched an already downed Bonjasky. First the referee Nobuaki Kakuda issued a yellow card and one point deduction. Meanwhile, Hari proceeded to Bonjasky's corner shouting, and quarreled with his opponent's trainer Ivan Hippolyte who then also approached Hari aggressively, but the officials prevented any further physical contact between them. After the five-minute recovery time elapsed, the doctor reported Bonjasky was seeing double and could not continue. Hari was issued a red card and Bonjasky was declared the K-1 World GP 2008 champion.

In later interviews Hari claimed Bonjasky was acting, and that "Remy's corner was screaming at him to stay down". At a press conference before the K-1 World Grand Prix 2009 in Yokohama, where Alistair Overeem attended along with Bonjasky, Overeem handed Bonjasky a statue which looked exactly like the statue of Oscar, implying Bonjasky was acting.

Although numerous Japanese media sources assumed that K-1 would suspend Hari indefinitely, he was not suspended, but he received the most severe punishment in the history of K-1. K-1 stripped him of his heavyweight title, his runner-up title in the tournament, his prize money from the tournament and the full amount of his fee for participation in the tournament.

Dynamite!! 2008
While there were many rumours of his and his opponent's participation, it was finally announced that Hari would face MMA Heavyweight Alistair Overeem in a K-1 rules match on K-1's New Year's Eve extravaganza Dynamite!! 2008. Hari lost the fight by a left hook KO at 2:02 in the first round. After the match, Hari commented that this would be the last time he would participate in the Dynamite!! series, and that he would stick to stand-up fighting so he would never have an MMA rules match with Overeem.

2009
In May 2009 at the It's Showtime 2009 Amsterdam, Hari fought Semmy Schilt in a bout for the newly introduced It's Showtime World Heavyweight title. Hari came out very aggressively and knocked Schilt down twice in the first round. The fight was stopped after the second knockdown and Hari took the heavyweight title in 45 seconds. Simon Rutz, the president of It's Showtime, has referred to this as one of his favorite bouts in the history of It's Showtime.

In September 2009 at the K-1 World Grand Prix 2009 Final 16, Hari again used his right body shot to score a first-round knockout over Zabit Samedov.

At the selection for the K-1 World Grand Prix 2009 Final Hari chose to fight Ruslan Karaev for the third time. He made quick work of his first 2 opponents in the tournament with first-round knockouts over Ruslan Karaev and Alistair Overeem. Then in the final of the World Grand Prix Hari lost in a rematch against Semmy Schilt by KO after being knocked down 3 times in the first round.

2010
His first fight in 2010 was at the It's Showtime 2010 Prague in the Czech Republic, where Hari defended his Showtime heavyweight title with a second-round knockout over Mourad Bouzidi. In April Hari defeated Alexey Ignashov in the K-1 World Grand Prix 2010 in Yokohama. The fight went to decision, Hari's first non-knockout win in 3 years.

It's Showtime 2010 Amsterdam
Hari's Showtime title was again on the line against his former Chakuriki fellow Hesdy Gerges in Amsterdam in May.
Before the match, he claimed in a press interview that his opponent at the event was originally planned to be Remy Bonjasky but Bonjasky refused to fight Hari, stating Bonjasky was afraid to lose.

The It's Showtime 2010 Amsterdam event took place at the Amsterdam Arena in May 2010. Hari dominated most of the first round, hitting Gerges many times and having him on the ropes. Hesdy surprised everyone on the night for taking the punishment. In the second round, Hari knocked down Gerges, and when Gerges was standing up, Badr Hari kicked him in the face. Badr was again disqualified and did not speak in the ring after Gerges was announced the winner. Instead, training partner Melvin Manhoef apologized to the fans on Badr's behalf but was booed by the crowd. Gerges became the new "Its Showtime" Heavyweight champion.

2011
After the Gerges fight, Hari took a year off from kickboxing. He stated that it was his own choice. He made his return to the ring at It's Showtime 2011 Lyon against French Kickboxer, Gregory Tony. Rather than using the catwalks for his entrance he decided to walk through the crowd. The fight was actually delayed because of Hari being unable to get to the ring without security keeping the crowd away. What was expected to be a warm up fight for Hari, it turned out to be one-sided as Hari won by TKO in round one with 3 quick knockdowns.

Though the biggest interest was for Badr to rematch Hesdy Gerges for the Showtime heavyweight title it was announced that he would fight Romanian Daniel Ghita in September. Ghita had been ranked as one of the best 5 kickboxers in the world. Ghita had lost a decision against Gerges earlier in the year, but many felt he had been robbed and viewed him as a tough opponent for Hari.

The fight never materialised. Hari stated that he will compete in the 2011 K-1 World Grand Prix in October and December, and then face Gökhan Saki in the Netherlands on 28 January 2012 as his final match. However the K-1 World Grand Prix was cancelled due to financial difficulties.

2012
Hari faced Gökhan Saki at It's Showtime 2012 in Leeuwarden on 28 January 2012 in a kickboxing match. He defeated Saki by scoring three knockdowns in the first round before the referee stopped the fight, which earned him a TKO victory. He dropped Saki for the first time with a right uppercut. The second knockdown came from a right hook. Finally, he landed a right uppercut which dropped Saki and ended the fight.

In April 2012 new K-1 Global President Mike Kim announced that Hari would make his comeback under the organization's banner. Hari's first fight was on 27 May 2012 in Madrid, Spain against Anderson "Braddock" Silva. Hari won the bout via unanimous decision. Badr Hari was scheduled to participate in K-1's final qualifications in October in Asia and the K-1 World Grand Prix Final in New York in December however he was unable to participate due to uncertainty over his availability following allegations of two separate incidents of serious assault.

2013

Having been released from detention, Hari was given the chance to fight in the K-1 World Grand Prix 2012 Final in Zagreb, Croatia on 15 March 2013 when Ben Edwards withdrew. He rematched Zabit Samedov in the quarter-finals. Hari scored a knockdown early in round one and forced a standing eight count in three, after which he simply jogged away from Samedov for the rest of the fight while the Azerbaijani taunted him. He won by unanimous decision but injured his foot in the bout and was forced to bow out of the tournament.

A third fight with Zabit Samedov took place at the Legend Fighting Show in Moscow, Russia on 25 May 2013. After being dropped late in round one, he was sent to the canvas again with a left hook in the second. Although he seemed lucid, he stayed on his knees and did not beat the count.

Hari had his rubber match with Alexey Ignashov at Legend Fighting Show 2 in Moscow on 9 November 2013, taking a unanimous decision win in a rather lackluster fight.

2014
Hari was expected to fight Ismael Londt at the A1 World Combat Cup in Eindhoven, Netherlands on 17 May 2014 but the match was cancelled when the promoters had issues acquiring a license to promote the event. Hari won a four-man (Tammam Majzoub was supposed to be in this fight but cancelled due to busy schedule) tournament at GFC Series 1 in Dubai, United Arab Emirates on 29 May 2014, having his rubber match with two former foes; he knocked out Stefan Leko in the semi-finals and scored a TKO over Peter Graham in the final. He reportedly earned 1,000,000 Emirati dirham in prize money for the tournament win.

On 6 July 2014, Hari announced via social media his intention to take an indefinite leave from kickboxing in order to find himself. The following day, however, he denied ever making such a statement and disavowed his "official" Facebook account.

Hari was expected to fight Patrice Quarteron at GFC Series 2 in Dubai, UAE on 16 October 2014. Eventually, he refused the fight, and fought a Lithuanian fighter instead, saying Quarteron did not behave sportingly.

2016–present
Hari made his Glory debut against the reigning Heavyweight Champion Rico Verhoeven at Glory: Collision on October 12, 2016. Hari appeared to have won the first round, opening a cut on Verhoeven's nose. Verhoeven was more aggressive in the second round and landed knee in the clinch which broke Hari's arm. As Hari was unable to continue fighting, Verhoeven was awarded the technical knockout victory.

On 3 March 2018, Hari fought Gerges. Hari won the fight by unanimous decision, but a year after the fight it was revealed that both fighters had used sports supplements that contained prohibited substances; as a result, both fighters were suspended. Hari failed a drug test prior to Glory 51: Rotterdam, and was issued with a 19-month suspension after tests on samples provided indicated a violation of Netherlands rules regarding prohibited substances for competitive athletes. Gerges, who faced Hari at the event, was also issued with an official reprimand.

Hari challenged Rico Verhoeven for the Glory Heavyweight Championship in his first post-suspension fight. The bout took place at Glory 74: Arnhem on 21 December 2019. In the sold-out GelreDome, in front of 30 000 fans, Verhoeven won the fight by a third-round technical knockout. Hari once again found early success, knocking Verhoeven down in both the first and third rounds. Early on in the third round however, Hari suffered a broken ankle from a missed kick, once again rendering him unable to continue competing.

Aside from selling out the arena, the rematch also drew 3.5 million viewers, an estimated 53% of the live television audience in the Netherlands, which was the second highest viewership of a live sports broadcast, in Dutch television history.

On 19 December 2020, Hari fought the #2 ranked Glory heavyweight contender, Benjamin Adegbuyi in a Glory Heavyweight Championship Eliminator at Glory 76. The fight was originally planned to take place on 20 June, but was postponed multiple times due to the COVID-19 pandemic. On 13 September, Glory announced the event would take place on 7 November, only for it be postponed again to 19 December 2020, when Hari announced that he tested positive for COVID-19 on 19 October. At the fight, Hari lost the fight by KO in the third round after being kicked by Adegbuyi. Glory vice-chairman Scott Rudmann revealed the following day that Hari suffered a double break in his nose on knockout.

It was announced on 31 May 2021, that Hari would face the #8 ranked Glory heavyweight contender Arkadiusz Wrzosek. The bout was scheduled as the main event of Glory 78: Arnhem, held on 4 September 2021. Hari had a great start to the bout and managed to knock Wrzosek down three times with body shots before the midway point of the fight. Halfway through the second round however, Wrzosek landed a head kick which knocked Hari out, extending his winless streak to five fights.

The two of them were scheduled to face each other in an immediate rematch at Glory 80 on March 19, 2022. The fight was declared a no contest, as the bout had to be stopped after the second round due to rioiting.

Hari faced Alistair Overeem on October 8, 2022, at the Glory: Collision 4. Hari lost the fight to Overeem  and stated that this was his last match and officially retired from kickboxing.

Personal life
Hari is married to Daphne Romani and has four daughters and one son.

In 2007, Hari released a hip-hop song with Dutch-Moroccan rapper Appa entitled "Stap Maar In De Ring" ("Just Step Into The Ring").

Legal issues 
Aside from the sport, he has been arrested multiple times since 2006 on various assault charges.

Hari has been the subject of a number of police investigations for charges of assault and has gained a reputation for violent behavior. A psychologist who spoke to Hari in relation to one of his trials concluded that his success as an athlete and celebrity status, combined with a lack of personal guidance, has resulted in narcissistic personality traits. About his violent eruptions, Hari has said: "I am able to explode at any moment. [...] When my brakes are off, it's just one big clump of explosion, chaos and noise, and I become blind to it all. [...] A storm, a hurricane, a disaster. [...] There just is a certain aggression inside of me, of which I don't know what to do with and neither where it comes from." At his conviction on 21 February 2014, the district attorney described Hari as an individual who is very short-tempered, indulges in vulgar power display, and demonstrates aggressive and intimidating behavior which is characterized by a high "do-you-even-know-who-I-am caliber".

Late October 2012, an indictment was handed to Hari in his holding cell, which contained nine criminal charges against Hari: eight crimes of violence and one moving violation. The moving violation relates to an incident in March 2010, where a pedestrian sustained injuries. The eight crimes of violence were: attempted manslaughter of Koen Everink (who was later murdered in 2016, however without link to Badr Hari), two assaults in night club Club Air, the assault of the brother of an ex-partner in bar Cooldown, an assault in club Jimmy Woo, an assault of two people including a woman in July 2011, and the assault of a doorman in 2010. An investigation is on going. If convicted he could face up to four years in prison.
 20 February 2010 Club Blinq. The bouncer of Club Blinq is assaulted by several perpetrators one of which is said to be Hari.
 6 March 2010 Albert Cuyp Market. Hari drives his car into the Albert Cuyp Street, which was closed to vehicle traffic, and has an accident with a pedestrian severely injuring her leg.
 1–29 July 2011 Spuistraat. Hari is accused of assaulting his ex-girlfriend Rosa in her apartment in Spuistraat and the destruction of her property.
 17 July 2011 Club Air. Jeroen van de Berg, the owner of the Club Air and an Italian guest are assaulted. Jeroen suffers serious damage to his teeth due to a kick to the head.
 2 December 2011 Cooldown Cafe. Hari is caught on camera in "The Cooldown Cafe" assaulting Olivier, the stepbrother of his ex-girlfriend.
 8 July 2012 Sensation White, Dutch millionaire entrepreneur Koen Everink is severely assaulted at a dance event in the Amsterdam Arena. Everink suffered a broken nose and eye socket and a broken ankle, which required several surgical procedures. The public prosecutor stated that numerous witnesses had pointed the finger at Hari.
 On 25 July 2012, Taken Into Custody. Hari turned himself in to the police in Amsterdam. He was taken into custody as a suspect for six cases; later his detainment was prolonged for 90 days.

In July 2012 Hari handed himself into police as he feared "being arrested by a SWAT team". Having come forth to deny his involvement in an alleged assault on businessman Koen Everink, who claimed Hari was responsible for inflicting his face and leg injuries including a broken ankle, further allegations of assault were made by an Amsterdam nightclub owner. The latter alleged that he had also been attacked by Hari, saying that he 'suffered a broken jaw and lost teeth after being kicked in the head' during an altercation at his nightclub and that in light of Everink's seeking to press charges, he would also seek to press charges.

As is procedure in the Netherlands for crimes that carry a statutory minimum four-year prison sentence or more, Hari was detained in prison whilst awaiting trial. On 9 November 2012 a court in Amsterdam decided to allow Hari to return home until his trial on the condition that he not visit any 'horeca' establishments (hotels, restaurants and café establishments), or contact witnesses, with the exception of his girlfriend Estelle Cruijff. The day following his release he was spotted violating this condition by eating out at a deli with his girlfriend Estelle Cruijff. He also made contact with two witnesses of the incident. As a result, three days after being released Hari was arrested again by police in Amsterdam and was sentenced to be detained once more, this time for three months, with his eventual release coming in January 2013.

On 21 January 2013 a court in Amsterdam determined that Hari should again be released from his pre-trial detention, this time with the condition that he could not visit catering establishments between the hours of 8:00 PM and 8:00 AM. By this point the main witnesses in the case had been heard; consequently the court deemed it unnecessary to further detain Hari. Following Hari's release he resumed training with the intention of returning to the ring. His trial was reportedly set to take place in March 2013; he faced nine charges including aggravated assault and attempted manslaughter.

On 21 February 2014 the district court in Amsterdam sentenced him to prison for 1½ years. His legal team filed an immediate appeal, as did the prosecution. However, the Court of Appeal found him guilty of aggravated assault, noting in particular that each of his assaults was preceded by a relatively mild quarrel and that to his victims his violent behaviour came as a complete surprise, leaving them no chance to defend themselves. He was sentenced to two years in prison, of which ten months suspended. Since he had already spent eight months in pre-arrest, he still had to serve half a year in prison. In addition, he has to pay his victims compensation of €45,000 in total. This judgement was upheld by the Supreme Court of the Netherlands in 2017.

Hari is friends with the President of Chechnya (Russia), Ramzan Kadyrov.

Hari was reportedly arrested in Dubai following his tournament win at Global FC 3 on 29 May 2014, and he was detained and questioned by police over an alleged incident from late 2011/early 2012 before being released, according to his lawyer. Hari himself refuted the reports.

Failed drug tests

GLORY 51
On April 20, 2019, it was announced that Hari failed a drug test prior to Glory 51: Rotterdam. He was issued with a 19-month suspension after tests on samples provided indicated a violation of Doping Autoriteit Netherlands rules regarding prohibited substances for competitive athletes. Hesdy Gerges, who faced Hari at the event, was also issued with an official reprimand.

Championships and accomplishments
K-1
 2007-2008 K-1 Heavyweight Champion  
 2008 K-1 World Grand Prix runner-up
 2009 K-1 World Grand Prix runner-up
It's Showtime
 2009-2010 It's Showtime Heavyweight Champion
GLORY
2020 Fight of the Year vs. Benjamin Adegbuyi at Glory 76: Rotterdam
GFC
 2014 Fight Series 1 Heavyweight Tournament Champion
Muay Thai
 2002 WPKL Dutch Muay Thai Champion
 2002 The Eight Tournament Winner
 2003 M-1 Heavyweight Tournament runner-up

Kickboxing record

|-  style="background:#c5d2ea;"
| 2022-10-08 || NC ||align=left| Alistair Overeem || Glory Collision 4 || Arnhem, Netherlands || No Contest  || 3 ||  3:00 ||80-16-3
|-
! style=background:white colspan=9 |

|-  style="background:#c5d2ea;"
| 2022-03-19 || NC ||align=left| Arkadiusz Wrzosek || Glory 80 || Hasselt, Belgium || No Contest || 2 || 3:00   ||80-16-2
|-
! style=background:white colspan=9 |
|-|-  style="background:#fbb;"
| 2021-09-04|| Loss||align=left| Arkadiusz Wrzosek || Glory 78: Rotterdam || Rotterdam, Netherlands || KO (Head kick) || 2 || 1:30   ||80-16-1
|-  style="background:#fbb;"
| 2020-12-19 || Loss ||align=left| Benjamin Adegbuyi || Glory 76: Rotterdam || Rotterdam, Netherlands || TKO (Referee stoppage) || 3 || 0:50  ||80-15-1
|-
! style=background:white colspan=9 |
|-
|-  style="background:#fbb;"
| 2019-12-21 || Loss ||align=left| Rico Verhoeven || Glory: Collision 2 || Arnhem, Netherlands || TKO (Leg injury) || 3 || 0:59  ||80-14-1
|-
|-  style="background:#c5d2ea;"
| 2018-03-03 || NC || align="left" | Hesdy Gerges || Glory 51: Rotterdam || Rotterdam, Netherlands || No Contest || 3 || 3:00  ||80-13-1
|-
! style=background:white colspan=9 | 
|-
|-  style="background:#fbb;"
| 2016-12-10 || Loss ||align=left| Rico Verhoeven || Glory: Collision || Oberhausen, Germany || TKO (Arm injury) || 2 || 1:22  ||80-13
|-
|-  style="background:#cfc;"
| 2015-08-22 || Win ||align=left| Ismael Londt || Akhmat Fight Show || Grozny, Russia || TKO (Straight right) || 3 || 0:42  ||80-12
|-
|-  style="background:#cfc;"
| 2014-10-16 || Win ||align=left| Arnold Oborotov || GFC Fight Series 2 || Dubai, UAE || KO (Right body shot) || 1 || 2:06   ||79-12
|-
|-  style="background:#cfc;"
| 2014-05-29 || Win ||align=left| Peter Graham || GFC Fight Series 1 – Heavyweight Tournament, Final || Dubai, UAE || TKO (Punches) || 1 || 1:34 ||78-12
|-
! style=background:white colspan=9 |
|-
|-  style="background:#cfc;"
| 2014-05-29 || Win ||align=left| Stefan Leko || GFC Fight Series 1 – Heavyweight Tournament, Semi Finals || Dubai, UAE || KO (Right cross) || 1 || 1:38 ||77-12
|-
|-  style="background:#cfc;"
| 2013-11-09 || Win ||align=left|  Alexey Ignashov || Legend Fighting Show 2 || Moscow, Russia || Decision (Unanimous) || 3 || 3:00  ||76-12
|-  style="background:#fbb;"
| 2013-05-25 || Loss ||align=left|  Zabit Samedov || Legend Fighting Show 1 || Moscow, Russia || KO (Left hook)  || 2 || 2:16  ||75-12
|-  style="background:#cfc;"
| 2013-03-15 || Win ||align=left|  Zabit Samedov || K-1 World Grand Prix 2012 Final, Quarter Finals || Zagreb, Croatia || Decision (Unanimous) || 3 || 3:00 ||75-11
|-  style="background:#cfc;"
| 2012-05-27 || Win ||align=left|  Anderson Silva || K-1 World MAX 2012 World Championship Tournament Final 16,Super Fight|| Madrid, Spain|| Decision (Unanimous)|| 3 ||3:00||74-11 
|-  style="background:#cfc;"
| 2012-01-28 || Win ||align=left|  Gökhan Saki  || It's Showtime 2012 in Leeuwarden || Leeuwarden, Netherlands || TKO (Referee stoppage)  || 1 || 2:44 ||73-11
|-  style="background:#cfc;
| 2011-05-14 || Win ||align=left| Gregory Tony || It's Showtime 2011 Lyon || Lyon, France || TKO (Ref. stop/5 knockdowns) || 1 || 2:43 ||72-11
|-  style="background:#fbb;" 
| 2010-05-29 || Loss ||align=left| Hesdy Gerges || It's Showtime 2010 Amsterdam || Amsterdam, Netherlands || DQ (Kicked downed opponent) || 2 || 0:48 ||71-11
|-
! style=background:white colspan=9 |
|-  style="background:#cfc;"
| 2010-04-03 || Win ||align=left| Alexey Ignashov || K-1 World Grand Prix 2010 in Yokohama ||Yokohama, Japan || Decision (Unanimous) || 3 || 3:00 ||71-10
|-  style="background:#cfc;"
| 2010-02-13 || Win ||align=left| Mourad Bouzidi || It's Showtime 2010 Prague || Prague, Czech Republic || KO (Right uppercut) || 2 ||  2:55 ||70-10
|-
! style=background:white colspan=9 |
|-  style="background:#fbb;"
| 2009-12-05 || Loss ||align=left| Semmy Schilt ||K-1 World Grand Prix 2009 Final || Yokohama, Japan || TKO (Ref. stop/3 knockdowns)|| 1 || 1:48 ||69-10
|-
! style=background:white colspan=9 |
|-  style="background:#cfc;"
| 2009-12-05 || Win ||align=left| Alistair Overeem ||K-1 World Grand Prix 2009 Final || Yokohama, Japan || TKO (Ref. stop/2 knockdowns) || 1 || 2:14 ||69-9
|-  style="background:#cfc;
| 2009-12-05 || Win ||align=left| Ruslan Karaev || K-1 World Grand Prix 2009 Final || Yokohama, Japan || KO (Right hook) || 1 || 0:38 ||68-9
|-  style="background:#cfc;"
| 2009-09-26 || Win ||align=left| Zabit Samedov || K-1 World Grand Prix 2009 Final 16 || Seoul, South Korea || KO (Right body shot) || 1 || 2:15 ||67-9
|-  style="background:#cfc;"
| 2009-05-16 || Win ||align=left| Semmy Schilt || It's Showtime 2009 Amsterdam || Amsterdam, Netherlands || KO (Right cross) || 1 || 0:45 ||66-9
|-
! style=background:white colspan=9 |
|-  style="background:#cfc;"
| 2009-02-08 || Win ||align=left| Frederic Sinistra || Fights at the Border presents: It's Showtime 2009 || Antwerp, Belgium || KO (Right cross) || 1 || 2:06 ||65-9
|-  style="background:#fbb;"
| 2008-12-31 || Loss  ||align=left| Alistair Overeem || Dynamite!! 2008 || Saitama, Japan || KO (Left hook) || 1 || 2:02 ||64-9
|-  style="background:#fbb;"
| 2008-12-06 || Loss  ||align=left| Remy Bonjasky || K-1 World GP 2008 Final || Yokohama, Japan || DQ (Illegal kick)  || 2 || 0:53 ||64-8
|-
! style=background:white colspan=9 |
|-  style="background:#cfc;"
| 2008-12-06 || Win  ||align=left| Errol Zimmerman || K-1 World GP 2008 Final || Yokohama, Japan || KO (Right cross)  || 3 || 2:15  ||64-7
|-  style="background:#cfc;
| 2008-12-06 || Win  ||align=left| Peter Aerts || K-1 World GP 2008 Final || Yokohama, Japan || TKO (Referee stoppage)  || 2 || 1:39 ||63-7
|-  style="background:#cfc;"
| 2008-09-27 || Win ||align=left| Hong Man Choi || K-1 World Grand Prix 2008 in Seoul Final 16 || Seoul, Korea || TKO (Corner stoppage) || 3 || 3:00  ||62-7 
|-  style="background:#cfc;" 
| 2008-08-09 || Win ||align=left| Domagoj Ostojic || K-1 World GP 2008 in Hawaii || Honolulu, United States || KO (Left cross) || 1 || 0:19 ||61-7 
|-  style="background:#cfc;" 
| 2008-06-29 || Win ||align=left| Glaube Feitosa || K-1 World GP 2008 in Fukuoka || Fukuoka, Japan || KO (Right cross) || 1 || 2:26  ||60-7 
|-
! style=background:white colspan=9 |
|-  style="background:#cfc;"
| 2008-04-13 || Win ||align=left| Ray Sefo || K-1 World GP 2008 in Yokohama || Yokohama, Japan || TKO (Referee stoppage) || 1 || 2:43 ||59-7
|-  style="background:#fbb;
| 2007-12-08 ||Loss ||align=left| Remy Bonjasky || K-1 World GP 2007 Final || Yokohama, Japan || Decision (Majority) || 3 || 3:00  ||58-7
|-  style="background:#cfc;
| 2007-09-29 || Win ||align=left| Doug Viney || K-1 World GP 2007 in Seoul Final 16 || Seoul, Korea || KO (Right cross) || 2 || 1:23  ||58-6
|-  style="background:#cfc;"
| 2007-08-05 || Win ||align=left| Peter Graham || K-1 World GP 2007 in Hong Kong || Hong Kong, China || Decision (Unanimous) || 3 || 3:00 ||57-6
|-  style="background:#cfc;"
| 2007-04-28 || Win ||align=left| Yusuke Fujimoto || K-1 World GP 2007 in Hawaii || Honolulu, United States || KO (High kick) || 1 || 0:56 ||56-6
|-
! style=background:white colspan=9 |
|-  style="background:#cfc;"
| 2007-03-04 || Win ||align=left| Ruslan Karaev || K-1 World GP 2007 in Yokohama || Yokohama, Japan || KO (Right cross) || 2 || 2:46 ||55-6
|-  style="background:#cfc;"
| 2006-12-31 || Win ||align=left| Nicholas Pettas || K-1 Premium 2006 Dynamite!! || Tokyo, Japan || TKO (Arm injury) || 2 || 1:28 ||54-6
|-  style="background:#cfc;"
| 2006-12-06 || Win ||align=left| Paul Slowinski || K-1 World Grand Prix 2006 || Tokyo, Japan || Decision (Unanimous) || 3 || 3:00 ||53-6
|-  style="background:#fbb;"
| 2006-09-30 || Loss ||align=left| Ruslan Karaev || K-1 World Grand Prix 2006 in Osaka Opening Round || Osaka, Japan || KO (Right punch) || 1 || 0:52 ||52-6
|-  style="background:#fbb;"
| 2006-03-05 || Loss ||align=left| Peter Graham || K-1 World Grand Prix 2006 in Auckland || Auckland, New Zealand || KO (Rolling thunder) || 3 || 2:54 ||52-5
|-  style="background:#cfc;
| 2005-11-19 || Win ||align=left| Stefan Leko || K-1 World Grand Prix 2005 || Tokyo, Japan || KO (Spinning right high heel kick) || 2 || 1:30 ||52-4
|-  style="background:#fbb;"
| 2005-06-12 ||Loss ||align=left| Stefan Leko || It's Showtime 2005 Amsterdam || Amsterdam, Netherlands || KO (Spinning back mid kick) || 1 || 1:44 ||51-4
|-  style="background:#cfc;"
| 2005-04-16 || Win ||align=left| Vitali Akhramenko || K-1 Italy 2005 Oktagon || Milan, Italy || Decision (Unanimous) || 3 || 3:00  ||51-3
|-  style="background:#cfc;"
| 2005-03-11 || Win ||align=left| Domagoj Ostojic || Ultimate Nokaut 1 || Karlovac, Croatia || KO (Right hook) || 2 || 0:10  ||50-3
|-  style="background:#cfc;"
| 2004-12-12 || Win ||align=left| Gary Turner || Rings Fightgala "Born Invincible" || Utrecht, Netherlands || Decision (Unanimous) || 5 || 3:00 ||49-3
|-  style="background:#cfc;"
| 2004-10-10 || Win ||align=left| Gökhan Saki || 2 Hot 2 Handle || Rotterdam, Netherlands || TKO (Corner stoppage) || 2 || 3:00 ||48-3
|-  style="background:#cfc;"
| 2004-05-20 || Win ||align=left| Aziz Khattou || It's Showtime 2004 Amsterdam || Amsterdam, Netherlands || KO (Knees) || 2 || 1:45 ||47-3
|-  style="background:#cfc;"
| 2004-03-21 || Win ||align=left| Errol Parris || Profighters Gala in Almere || Almere, Netherlands || KO (Right hook) || 5 || N/A ||46-3
|-  style="background:#cfc;"
| 2003-09-27 || Win ||align=left| Antoni Hardonk || Rings Fightgala || Utrecht, Netherlands || Decision (Unanimous) || 5 || 3:00 ||45-3
|-  style="background:#fbb;"
| 2003-06-08 || Loss ||align=left| Alexey Ignashov || It's Showtime 2003 Amsterdam || Amsterdam, Netherlands || KO (Right cross) || 3 || 2:55 ||44-3
|-  style="background:#fbb;"
| 2003-05-16 || Loss ||align=left| Ivan Rudan || M-1 (First World Selection) || Mestre, Italy || (T)KO (Injury) || N/A || N/A  ||44-2
|-  style="background:#cfc;"
| 2003-05-16 || Win ||align=left| Mindaugas Kulikauskas || M-1 (First World Selection) || Mestre, Italy || KO || 2 || N/A  ||44-1
|-  style="background:#cfc;"
| 2003-03-30 || Win ||align=left| Dennis Strijbis || Rings Fightgala || Utrecht, Netherlands || Decision (Unanimous) || 5 || 3:00 || 43-1
|-  style="background:#cfc;"
| 2003-02-02 || Win ||align=left| Ahmet Lakus || Killerdome II || Amsterdam, Netherlands || TKO || 4 || N/A  ||42-1
|-  style="background:#cfc;"
| 2002-12-14 || Win ||align=left| Mutlu Karabulut || The Eight Tournament Final || Amsterdam, Netherlands || KO || 2 || N/A ||41-1
|-
! style=background:white colspan=9 |
|-  style="background:#cfc;"
| 2002-12-14 || Win ||align=left| Makhloufi|| The Eight Tournament Semi-final|| Amsterdam, Netherlands || KO || 1 || N/A ||40-1
|-  style="background:#cfc;"
| 2002-12-14 || Win ||align=left| Ed Schaper || The Eight Tournament Quarter-final || Amsterdam, Netherlands || KO || 1 || N/A ||39-1
|-  style="background:#cfc;"
| 2002-11-24 || Win || align="left" | Karim Mrabet || Xena Sports Victory or Hell || Netherlands || Decision || 3 || 3:00 ||38-1
|-  style="background:#cfc;"
| 2002-10-20 || Win ||align=left| Ahmet Lakus || Warriors Fight Night || Dordrecht, Netherlands || TKO (Doctor stoppage) || 5 || N/A  ||37-1
|-  style="background:#cfc;"
| 2002-02-17 || Win ||align=left| Willy Schneider || WPKL Gala in Hogendorphal || Amsterdam, Netherlands || TKO (Doctor stoppage) || 3 || N/A ||36-1

See also
 List of K-1 events
 List of K-1 champions
 List of It's Showtime champions
 List of male kickboxers

References

External links
 
 Profile at Glory 

1984 births
Doping cases in kickboxing
Dutch Muay Thai practitioners
Dutch male kickboxers
Dutch male mixed martial artists
Dutch sportspeople of Moroccan descent
Dutch sportspeople in doping cases
Heavyweight mixed martial artists
Mixed martial artists utilizing kickboxing
Mixed martial artists utilizing Muay Thai
Living people
Moroccan Muay Thai practitioners
Moroccan male kickboxers
Moroccan male mixed martial artists
Moroccan sportspeople in doping cases
Sportspeople from Amsterdam
Heavyweight kickboxers